Ola High School is a public high school located in McDonough, Georgia, United States.  Its student body consists of about 1,400 students in grades 9–12.  Its facilities include a football field, track, baseball field, tennis courts, marching band field, and a gymnasium for basketball.

The Ola Middle School is adjacent to the high school.

History
In response to overcrowding at existing schools and growth and development in the rural southeastern area of Henry County, the Henry County Board of Education elected in 2005 to build a middle and a high school near the Ola unincorporated area, near the existing Ola Elementary School.  Construction began the same year and was completed in May 2006, two months before the opening date of August 3, 2006.  The total project cost for Ola Middle School and Ola High School was $43,585,000 and was completed by the Manhattan Construction Company.

Athletics
The following sports are offered:

 Baseball 
 Basketball 
 Cheerleading 
 Cross country 
 Football 
 Girls' lacrosse
 Golf 
 Gymnastics
 Soccer 
 Softball 
 Swimming 
 Tennis 
 Track 
 Volleyball 
 Wrestling

References

External links
 

Educational institutions established in 2006
Public high schools in Georgia (U.S. state)
Schools in Henry County, Georgia
2006 establishments in Georgia (U.S. state)